V. K. Kothandaraman was an Indian politician and former Member of the Legislative Assembly of Tamil Nadu. He was elected to the Tamil Nadu legislative assembly from Gudiyatham constituency in 1957, 1967 and 1977 elections.

He was born on 20th May 1912 in an orthodox Hindu family but later became a Communist. He was an honest and enthusiastic political leader. In a short time, he became the leader of the Communist Party in Tamil Nadu.

References 

Members of the Tamil Nadu Legislative Assembly
Communist Party of India (Marxist) politicians from Tamil Nadu
Year of birth missing